Ștefan Marian Cană (born 7 August 2000) is a Romanian professional footballer who plays as a centre-back for Foresta Suceava, on loan from FCSB .

Career statistics

Club

References

2000 births
Living people
Romanian footballers
Association football defenders
Liga I players
Liga II players
FC Steaua București players
FCV Farul Constanța players
FC Politehnica Iași (2010) players